McKesson Corporation is an American company distributing pharmaceuticals and providing health information technology, medical supplies, and care management tools. The company delivers a third of all pharmaceuticals used in North America and employs over 78,000 employees. McKesson had revenues of $238.2 billion in its fiscal year ending March 31, 2021.

McKesson is based in Irving, Texas, and distributes health care systems, medical supplies and pharmaceutical products. Additionally, McKesson provides extensive network infrastructure for the health care industry; also, it was an early adopter of technologies like bar-code scanning for distribution, pharmacy robotics, and RFID tags. The company has been named in a federal lawsuit of profiting from the opioid epidemic in the United States.

Throughout the COVID-19 pandemic, McKesson has expanded on its well-established credentials as key vaccine distributor, serving as the U.S. government's centralized distributor for hundreds of millions of COVID-19 vaccine doses and ancillary supply kits for over 1 billion doses across the United States.

, McKesson was ranked #7 on the Fortune 500 rankings of the largest United States corporations, with revenues of $238.2 billion.

History
Founded in New York City as Charles M. Olcott in 1828 and later as Olcott, McKesson & Co. by Charles Olcott and John McKesson in 1833, the business began as an importer and wholesaler of botanical drugs.

A third partner, Daniel Robbins, who had joined the enterprise as it grew, and who previously "was an assistant to the original partners," was the Robbins when the company was renamed McKesson & Robbins following Olcott's death in 1853.

The company successfully emerged from the fraud by CEO Phillip Musica one of the most notorious business/accounting scandals of the 20th century—the McKesson & Robbins scandal, a watershed event that led to major changes in American auditing standards and securities regulations after being exposed in 1938.

In 1967, Foremost Dairies, a company founded by James Cash Penney that had been headquartered in San Francisco since 1954, acquired McKesson & Robbins in a hostile takeover to form Foremost-McKesson Inc. The Foremost dairy operations were sold in 1982 and the name changed to McKesson Corporation but headquarters remained in San Francisco.

In 1999, McKesson acquired medical information systems firm HBO & Company (HBOC). The combined firm operated as McKessonHBOC for two years. Accounting irregularities at HBOC reduced the company's share price by half, and resulted in the dismissal and prosecution of many HBOC executives. The firm's name reverted to "McKesson" in 2001. McKesson has increased its market in medical technology through acquisitions, including Per Se Technologies and RelayHealth in 2006 and Practice Partner in 2007.

In 2010, McKesson acquired the oncology and physician services company US Oncology, Inc. for $2.16 billion, which was integrated into the McKesson Specialty Health business.

On June 24, 2013, The Wall Street Journal reported that McKesson Chairman and CEO John Hammergren's pension benefits of $159 million had set a record for "the largest pension on file for a current executive of a public company, and almost certainly the largest ever in corporate America".

In addition to its offices throughout North America, McKesson also has international offices in Australia, Ireland, France, the Netherlands, and the United Kingdom. Today, McKesson is one of the oldest operating businesses in the United States.

In 2014, McKesson acquired Celesio to become one of the world's largest health care companies, with over $179 billion in annual revenue.

In June 2016, McKesson announced plans to merge its IT business with Change Healthcare.

In 2017, McKesson was involved in a number of lawsuits against the state of Arkansas over the supply of vecuronium bromide. McKesson was under contract by Pfizer not to sell to any correctional facility that authorized and carried out Capital punishment.

In November 2018, the company announced it would relocate its headquarters from San Francisco to Irving, Texas in April 2019.

On April 1, 2019, the company officially moved their headquarters to Irving, Texas. Also that month, Brian Tyler took over as CEO of the company.

In February 2020, McKesson Corp announced that it would part ways with Change Healthcare. McKesson would give up its three seats on Change's board of directors, and as an entity will no longer own any portion of Change.

In August 2020 during the COVID-19 pandemic, the CDC and HHS selected McKesson as the U.S. government's centralized distributor for Covid-19 vaccine doses and ancillary supply kits under Operation Warp Speed. As of May 5, 2022, McKesson had distributed over 380 million vaccine doses and assembled supply kits to support over 1.2 billion vaccines doses as of July 31, 2021. See Covid-19 Centralized Vaccine Distributor.

Finances 
For the fiscal year 2018, McKesson reported earnings of US$67 million, with an annual revenue of US$208.357 billion, an increase of 5.0% over the previous fiscal cycle. McKesson's shares traded at over $142 per share, and its market capitalization was valued at over US$24.3 billion in October 2018. As of 2018, McKesson was ranked #6 on the Fortune 500 rankings of the largest United States corporations by total revenue.

Divisions

McKesson Provider Technologies
McKesson Provider Technologies is the retail name for McKesson Technology Solutions; the software development division of McKesson. Their customer base in the United States includes 50% of all health systems, 20% of all physician practices, 25% of home care agencies, and 77% of health systems with more than 200 beds.

On June 20, 2005, McKesson Provider Technologies acquired Medcon, Ltd., an Israeli company which provides Web-based cardiac image and information management solutions for heart centers, that includes: diagnostic digital image management, archiving, procedure reporting, and workflow management.

In October 2013, McKesson agreed to buy a 50% stake in German peer Celesio for $8.3 billion.

McKesson Medical Supplies and Equipment 

McKesson Medical-Surgical (MMS) offers a large selection of national health care brands, along with McKesson's exclusive brand of medical products.

Their online medical supply ordering platform serves the needs of physician offices, surgery centers, home health agencies, DMEs, labs, and long-term-care facilities.

In 2015 McKesson Medical-Surgical opened its new headquarters in Richmond, Virginia.

Health Mart pharmacy franchise

Health Mart is a network of over 4,000 independently owned and operated pharmacies. It is a wholly owned subsidiary of McKesson Corporation, which owns the name "Health Mart". McKesson acquired Health Mart owner FoxMeyer in October 1996.

Former divisions
McKesson operated the Mosswood Wine Company from 1978 until 1987, when the division was sold to maintain their focus on pharmaceuticals. The division was founded and run by wine writer Gerald Asher.

NDC Health
NDC (from the initials of its former identity as National Data Corporation) became NDC-Health Corp in 2001.

National Data Corporation
National Data Corporation was a time-sharing company that began in 1967 and subsequently absorbed competitor Rapidata. Rapidata held on, and became part of National Data Corporation. It was still of sufficient interest in 1982 to be the focus of "A User's Guide to Statistics Programs: The Rapidata Timesharing System". Even as revenue fell by 66% and National Data subsequently developed its own problems, attempts were made to keep this timesharing business going.

Rapidata was listed in The AUERBACH Guide to Time Sharing in 1973.

Opioid crisis
In 2008, McKesson paid $13 million in fines for failing to report huge orders of hydrocodone. In January 2017, McKesson agreed to pay a $150 million civil penalty for alleged similar violations of the Controlled Substances Act regarding the distribution of opioids.

In May 2020, Oklahoma Attorney General Mike Hunter sued McKesson in Bryan County District Court, Oklahoma. The lawsuit alleged that the company's actions helped fuel Oklahoma's opioid crisis. The suit was filed along with lawsuits against Cardinal Health and AmerisourceBergen, and the three lawsuits allege that the three companies provided "enough opioids to Bryan County that every adult resident there could have had 144 hydrocodone tablets."

In January 2022, McKesson, AmerisourceBergen, Cardinal Health, and Johnson & Johnson agreed to pay $26 billion to settle with all but five of the states suing them. Had the states gone to court, the companies could have faced up to $95 billion in penalties.

Covid-19 Centralized Vaccine Distributor
In August 2020 during the COVID-19 pandemic, the CDC and HHS selected McKesson as the U.S. government's centralized distributor for Covid-19 vaccine doses and ancillary supply kits under Operation Warp Speed, highlighting the company's long-standing role as major vaccine distributor in the United States (including its position as the largest distributor of the seasonal flu vaccine). The company has played a key role in distributing the Moderna and Johnson & Johnson vaccines while also distributing ancillary supply kits for these as well as for the Pfizer–BioNTech vaccine across the U.S. (in addition to supporting the U.S. government in efforts to send doses and kits abroad).

As of May 5, 2022, McKesson had distributed over 380 million vaccine doses and delivered supply kits to support over 1.2 billion vaccines doses throughout the United States.

International

McKesson Canada

In 1991, McKesson Corporation acquired a 100 percent interest in Medis Health and Pharmaceutical Services from Provigo. In 2002, the McKesson Canada name was adopted. McKesson Canada is a wholly owned subsidiary of McKesson Corporation. It includes various business units: McKesson Pharmaceutical, McKesson Automation, McKesson Specialty, McKesson Health Solutions and McKesson Information Solutions.

McKesson agreed to purchase Canadian pharmacy chain The Medicine Shoppe from the Katz Group of Companies
https://www.medicineshoppe.ca/en/who-we-are/who-we-are

In March 2016, McKesson agreed to purchase Canadian pharmacy chain Rexall from the Katz Group of Companies for $3 billion. The deal was finalized in December 2016 following approval received under the Investment Canada Act.

In May 2018, McKesson Canada closed 40 Rexall locations in Ontario and Western Canada.

United Kingdom
In the United Kingdom, McKesson (operating as McKesson Information Solutions UK Ltd) was a provider of information technology services to the health care industry. In addition to numerous clinical software systems and finance and procurement services, McKesson also was responsible for developing the Electronic Staff Record system for the National Health Service which provided an integrated payroll system for NHS's 1.3 million staff, making it the world's largest single payroll IT system. McKesson Shared Services also provided payroll services for over 20 NHS Trusts, paying over 100,000 NHS members.

McKesson's United Kingdom base was in Warwick with data centers in Newcastle upon Tyne and Brent Cross and offices in Sheffield, Bangor, Glasgow and Vauxhall, London. Across the United Kingdom, it employed over 500 people.

In June/July 2014 McKesson sold most of their healthcare software business to the private equity firm Symphony Technology Group and indicated also that they would not be re-bidding for the Electronic Staff Record contract. This came after the company had posted significant year on year losses in revenue (16% in the 2012/13 financial year) after taking over a very successful British operation in 2011.

In April 2022, McKesson UK was acquired by the private equity company, Aurelius Group in a £477m deal. The companies acquired by Aurelius include LloydsPharmacy, and AAH Pharmaceuticals.

Australia and New Zealand

In 2010, McKesson Asia-Pacific was acquired by Medibank Private Ltd.

McKesson ANZ is a fully owned subsidiary of McKesson Corporation. McKesson expanded its footprint in Australia and New Zealand by acquiring Emendo in November 2012. McKesson ANZ develops and sells healthcare optimization services and software. The company has traditionally been focused on the public markets in Australia and New Zealand. The majority of the District Health Boards in NZ use one or more of McKesson's Capacity Management solutions.

Christchurch, New Zealand, is one of McKesson's global Capacity Management R&D centers of excellence. All of McKesson's R&D for McKesson Capacity Planner is performed in New Zealand. The company employs approximately 40 team members across Australia and New Zealand including general management, R&D, sales, services, and support employees.

McKesson Capacity Planner (formerly Emendo CapPlan) is used in more than 40 hospitals in Australia, New Zealand, Britain, Canada and the US to forecast future patient activity and help health systems to allocate resources efficiently and identify unnecessary costs.

Germany
On November 2, 2020, Walgreens Boots Alliance and McKesson Corporation announced the completion of their previously announced agreement to create a joint venture combining their respective pharmaceutical wholesale businesses in Germany, Alliance Healthcare Deutschland (AHD) and GEHE Pharma Handel (GEHE). WBA holds a 70 percent controlling equity interest in the joint venture and McKesson holds the remaining 30 percent interest.

Facilities
In addition to its global headquarters in Irving, Texas, McKesson maintains facilities around North America.

Controversies 
In April 2012, McKesson agreed to pay the United States $190M to settle allegations that it had inflated prices and overbilled Medicaid.

In July 2012, McKesson agreed to pay California and 28 other states $151M to settle allegations that it had inflated prices and overbilled Medicaid.

In January 2017, McKesson agreed to pay $150M to settle allegations that it hadn't done enough to track and stop suspicious opioid sales. The agreement also obligated McKesson to suspend all sales of controlled substances from its distribution centres in Colorado, Ohio, Michigan, and Florida for multiple years.

See also

 Top 100 US Federal Contractors

References

External links
 

Companies based in Irving, Texas
Pharmaceutical companies of the United States
American companies established in 1833
1833 establishments in New York (state)
Companies listed on the New York Stock Exchange
Multinational companies headquartered in the United States
Health care companies based in Texas